San Vicente Creek may refer to a stream in California, in the United States:

San Vicente Creek (San Diego County)
San Vicente Creek (San Mateo County)
San Vicente Creek (Santa Cruz County)